Garden City is a city in Wayne County of the U.S. state of Michigan. As of the 2010 census, the city population was 27,692. M-153 (Ford Road) runs east–west through the center of the city.

History 
The city was patterned after the "garden city" concept that became popular in England during the 19th century, with most home sites sectioned off into  plots to allow adequate farming area to support the family with fruit and vegetables. Most sites are now considerably smaller, some as small as 40 feet by 135 feet, with little room for gardening of fruits and vegetables, though the city maintains some large lots where an extra street has not been placed between two of the older streets, such as between some parts of Bock Street and John Hauk Street where Donnelly Avenue does not cut through.

In June 1927, Garden City became a village within Nankin Township, with Arnold Folker as Village President. Six years later the village became the city of Garden City. Areas of interest in Garden City include the first Kmart store (opened 1962, closed in early 2017), the first Little Caesars (opened May 1959, closed in October 2018), located at 32594 Cherry Hill Road, and the first dine-in McDonald's in Michigan. The Folker Building, a gray stone structure located at the southeast corner of Ford and Middlebelt Roads, at what is considered downtown Garden City, was the first city hall.  It later contained Orin Jewelers and other retail establishments.  A new city hall was eventually constructed on Middlebelt Road between Ford and Warren Roads.  The honeymoon cottage of Henry Ford and his wife, Clara Jane Bryant, was moved here from Dearborn in 1952.

Geography 

Demographics

2010 census
As of the census of 2010, there were 27,692 people, 10,894 households, and 7,383 families living in the city. The racial makeup of the city was 92.5% White, 3.4% African American, 0.4% Native American, 0.8% Asian, 0.8% from other races, and 2.1% from two or more races. Hispanic or Latino of any race were 3.3% of the population.

There were 10,894 households, of which 31.7% had children under the age of 18 living with them, 48.2% were married couples living together, 13.6% had a female householder with no husband present, 6.0% had a male householder with no wife present, and 32.2% were non-families. 26.8% of all households were made up of individuals, and 10.7% had someone living alone who was 65 years of age or older. The average household size was 2.54 and the average family size was 3.07.

The median age in the city was 39.9 years. 22.4% of residents were under the age of 18; 8.5% were between the ages of 18 and 24; 26.5% were from 25 to 44; 28.6% were from 45 to 64; and 14% were 65 years of age or older. The gender makeup of the city was 49.1% male and 50.9% female.

2000 census
As of the census of 2000, there were 30,047 people, 11,479 households, and 8,230 families living in the city. The racial makeup of the city was 96.20% White, 1.10% African-American, 0.40% Native American, 0.72% Asian, 0.01% Pacific Islander, 0.30% from other races, and 1.27% from two or more races. Hispanic or Latino of any race were 2.03% of the population.

There were 11,479 households, out of which 32.5% had children under the age of 18 living with them, 56.0% were married couples living together, 11.2% had a female householder with no husband present, and 28.3% were non-families. 24.0% of all households were made up of individuals, and 9.7% had someone living alone who was 65 years of age or older.  The average household size was 2.62 and the average family size was 3.11.

In the city, the population was spread out, with 25.1% under the age of 18, 7.6% from 18 to 24, 32.6% from 25 to 44, 21.2% from 45 to 64, and 13.5% who were 65 years of age or older.  The median age was 36 years. For every 100 females, there were 97.4 males.  For every 100 females age 18 and over, there were 95.5 males.

The median income for a household in the city was $51,841, and the median income for a family was $58,530. Males had a median income of $44,314 versus $27,904 for females. The per capita income for the city was $21,651.  About 3.3% of families and 4.5% of the population were below the poverty line, including 4.2% of those under age 18 and 6.5% of those age 65 or over.

Education
The main source of education for Garden City is their school district, Garden City School District, which includes four elementary schools, one middle school, one public high school which also houses a performing arts center and a swimming pool, an alternative education high school called Cambridge High School. During the baby boom, a second high school was constructed, Garden City West High School, with teams called the Tigers. At that time, Garden City High School, whose teams had the name the Panthers, was renamed Garden City High School - East. After the census at both schools declined, Garden City West became Garden City Middle School with the four middle schools from the baby boom being dissolved. These middle schools were Burger, Radcliff, Vogel, and Cambridge. Burger Middle School became Burger School for Students with Autism, which has been renamed to Burger Baylor School, while still being under the authority of Garden City Public Schools.  Radcliff Middle School became a satellite campus for Schoolcraft College; the school has since sold Radcliff Center to the City for their Parks and Recreation Department. The former middle school and Schoolcraft campus are located directly next to the current Garden City Middle School. Vogel has since been razed, while Cambridge now serves as the district's alternative high school. After the dissolution of the two high schools, Garden City East resumed the name Garden City High School, with teams now called the Cougars. Tipton Academy, a charter school serving grades PK-7, is also located in Garden City.

St. Raphael Catholic School in Garden City closed in 2016.

References

External links 

 Garden City official website

Cities in Wayne County, Michigan
Metro Detroit
Populated places established in 1927
1927 establishments in Michigan